The Phillips Brothers Mill is a sawmill and box factory in Shasta County, California, near Oak Run, California, that was first built in 1898 and moved to its current site in 1933. It is notable for all production machinery being powered by stationary steam engines, little changed since it was first constructed. The mill produces both rough-sawn and planed lumber from locally harvested trees. The adjoining box factory originally produced packing crates for fruit growers but now produces decorative boxes for a variety of customers and gift items for sale at the mill. It was listed on the National Register of Historic Places in 2002.

Architect: Phillips Brothers

Historic function: Industry/processing/extraction

Historic subfunction: Manufacturing Facility

National Register of Historic Places reference number 02001406

References

External links
 Phillips Brothers Mill

CA

Industrial buildings and structures on the National Register of Historic Places in California
Historic districts on the National Register of Historic Places in California
National Register of Historic Places in Shasta County, California
Buildings and structures completed in 1933